Cycloramphus dubius is a species of frog in the family Cycloramphidae. It is endemic to the state of São Paulo, Brazil. Common name São Paulo button frog has been coined for it.

Description
The body is dorso-ventrally flattened. The snout is rounded or has a flared lip. The toes are moderately webbed. Dorsal skin is granular-rugose and overlain with shagreen. Dorsal coloration is uniform or rarely blotched but without distinctive colors.

Reproduction
Reproduction takes place near small waterfalls and continues throughout the year. Males call at night from rock crevices near the waterfalls. Average clutch size is 60 eggs (range 30–80 eggs). The eggs are deposited as a single layer outside water, but where they receive constant moisture from water droplets or spray. Males guard egg clutches and can defend them aggressively.

The tadpoles stay outside water, feeding above wet rocks.

Habitat and conservation
Adults are found on rocks and stones and the tadpoles on rocks covered with a film of running water, either in or next to streams.

Cycloramphus dubius is a reasonably common species. Major threats to it is air and water pollution from industry as well as disturbance of its habitat by touristic activities. Its range overlaps with a few protected areas. It is classified as of "least concern" by the International Union for Conservation of Nature (IUCN).

References

dubius
Endemic fauna of Brazil
Amphibians of Brazil
Taxa named by Alípio de Miranda-Ribeiro
Amphibians described in 1920
Taxonomy articles created by Polbot